The Mapleton Public Library is the public library serving Mapleton, Minnesota, United States.  It was built as a Carnegie library in 1910.  The building was listed on the National Register of Historic Places in 2009 for its local significance in the theme of social history.  It was nominated for representating the civic push for public libraries in Minnesota, abetted by philanthropic grants from steel magnate Andrew Carnegie.

See also
 National Register of Historic Places listings in Blue Earth County, Minnesota

References

External links
 Mapleton Public Library

1910 establishments in Minnesota
Buildings and structures in Blue Earth County, Minnesota
Carnegie libraries in Minnesota
Libraries on the National Register of Historic Places in Minnesota
Library buildings completed in 1910
National Register of Historic Places in Blue Earth County, Minnesota
Neoclassical architecture in Minnesota
Public libraries in Minnesota